Yellow Robe is a surname. Notable people with the surname include:

Chauncey Yellow Robe (1867-1930), Native American educator, lecturer and activist
Rosebud Yellow Robe (1907-1992), Native American folklorist, educator and author
William S. Yellow Robe Jr. (born 1950), Native American actor, author, director, educator, playwright, and poet

Native American surnames